Francis Henry Arthur Richmond (6 January 1936 – 16 March 2017) was the third Bishop of Repton from 1985 to 1999; and from then on, in retirement, an honorary assistant bishop within the Diocese of Oxford.

Richmond was educated at Trinity College, Dublin. Ordained in 1964, he began his career with a curacy at Woodlands, in Yorkshire. after which he was: a chaplain at Sheffield Cathedral; Vicar of St George's, Sheffield (during which time he was also a University Chaplain
); and finally, before his elevation to the episcopate, Warden of Lincoln Theological College. He was ordained and consecrated a bishop (thereby taking up his suffragan See) on 30 January 1986, by Robert Runcie, Archbishop of Canterbury, at Southwark Cathedral. After 14 years as the Derby Suffragan he retired to Oxford in 1999.

He died on 16 March 2017 at the age of 81.

References

1936 births
2017 deaths
Alumni of Trinity College Dublin
Bishops of Repton
20th-century Church of England bishops